"Without Love" is a song by English singer Dina Carroll, released as a standalone single on 12 July 1999. Produced by Alastair Johnson and Laurence Nelson, it, along with a host of remixes to suit all sections of the club scene, re-established her place in the UK music scene, reaching number 13 on the UK Singles Chart. The music video sees Carroll, dressed in black, performing with 10 dancers against a white backdrop.

Track listings

Charts

References

1999 singles
1999 songs
Dina Carroll songs
First Avenue Records singles